The Fifth Buddhist Council took place in Mandalay, Burma (Myanmar) in 1871 CE under the auspices of King Mindon of Burma (Myanmar). The chief objective of this meeting was to recite all the teachings of the Gautama Buddha according to the Pāli Canon of Theravada Buddhism  and examine them in minute detail to see if any of them had been altered, distorted or dropped. It was presided over by three elder bhikkhus, Mahathera Jagarabhivamsa, Narindabhidhaja, and Mahathera Sumangalasami in the company of 2400 monks. Their joint Dhamma recitation lasted five months.

The Fifth Buddhist council was a Burmese affair, and most other Buddhist countries were not involved in it. It is not generally recognized outside Burma. It has been argued that, since the Theravadin multinational Sixth Buddhist council received the name of "Sixth Buddhist council", this involved implicitly recognizing the fifth, even though most other nations were not involved in the fifth council, and the results of the fifth council were limited to the Burmese edition of the Pali Canon only. However, there were a number of other councils held in Ceylon and Siam between the fourth and sixth, so the total can be made up in other ways.

See also 
 Buddhist councils
 First Buddhist council
 Second Buddhist council
 Third Buddhist council
 Fourth Buddhist council
 Sixth Buddhist council
Pāli Canon
Sutta Pitaka
Vinaya Pitaka
Abhidhamma Pitaka
Tripiṭaka tablets at Kuthodaw Pagoda

References 

Buddhist council5
1871 in Asia
History of Buddhism in Myanmar
1871 in religion
19th-century Buddhism
1871 conferences